Lei Jun may refer to:
 Lei Jun (Chinese: 雷军), CEO of Xiaomi
 Short for Leidian Jiangjun (Chinese: 雷电将军), a fictional character from Genshin Impact